The 2001 World Table Tennis Championships mixed doubles was the 46th edition of the mixed doubles championship.  

Qin Zhijian and Yang Ying defeated Oh Sang-eun and Kim Moo-kyo in the final by three sets to nil.

Results

See also
 List of World Table Tennis Championships medalists

References

-